The General Encyclopedia of the Yugoslav Lexicographical Institute is a general encyclopedia published in eight volumes by the Yugoslav Lexicographical Institute in Zagreb between 1977 and 1982. It was the third edition of the encyclopedia, with the first two editions being published under the name Enciklopedija leksikografskog zavoda. The first edition in seven volumes was published between 1955 and 1964, and the second edition in six volumes was published between 1966 and 1969.

Volumes
The third edition of the encyclopedia has 8 volumes:

The third edition was amended with an additional volume (Dopunski svezak) published in 1988:

References

 

Croatian encyclopedias
Yugoslav culture
Books about Yugoslavia
1955 non-fiction books
1966 non-fiction books
1988 non-fiction books
20th-century encyclopedias